Félix Bermudes (4 July 1874 – 5 January 1960) was a Portuguese sports shooter. He competed in the team free rifle event at the 1924 Summer Olympics. He was also a significant author and playwright.

In 1916, Bermudes became the 10th president of sports club S.L. Benfica; he had a second term between 1945 and 1946. He composed the anthem of Benfica in 1929, called "Avante Benfica", which was censored by the Estado Novo.

Bermudes wrote many plays and film scripts, as well as magazine articles. He was one of the founding members of the Society of Portuguese Theater Writers and Composers and was its president from 1928 until his death in 1960. In 1925 he was made an Officer of the Military Order of Saint James of the Sword for Scientific, Literary and Artistic Merit. He was the father of Cesina Bermudes, a prominent obstetrician and opponent of the Estado Novo.

References

External links
 

1874 births
1960 deaths
Portuguese male sport shooters
Olympic shooters of Portugal
Shooters at the 1924 Summer Olympics
Sportspeople from Porto
S.L. Benfica presidents